Javier Enrique Caso Ravelo (born 20 March 1986) is a former Mexican football player who last played for Zacatepec.  He suffered a broken jaw in a game in September 2011.

References

External links 
 
 

1986 births
Living people
People from Xalapa
Footballers from Veracruz
Association football goalkeepers
Mexican footballers
Cruz Azul footballers
Club Atlético Zacatepec players
Chiapas F.C. footballers
Liga MX players